Ochoco West is a census-designated place (CDP) in Crook County, Oregon, United States. It was first listed as a CDP prior to the 2020 census.

The community is on the west side of the valley of Lytle Creek at the western foot of the Ochoco Mountains. Lytle Creek is a south-flowing tributary of the Crooked River and part of the Deschutes River watershed.

Demographics

References 

Census-designated places in Crook County, Oregon
Census-designated places in Oregon